The Minneapolis Fire Department provides fire protection and first responder emergency medical services to the city of Minneapolis, Minnesota.

Operations
The MFD currently operates out of 19 Fire Stations, located throughout the city in 5 Battalions, under the command of 5 Battalion Chiefs and 1 Deputy Chief each shift. The MFD is also home to the Minnesota Task Force One (MNTF1) USAR Unit.

Minnesota Task Force 1
The Minneapolis Fire Department is one of the sponsoring agencies of Minnesota Task Force 1 (MN-TF1) an urban search and rescue team based in Minneapolis–Saint Paul metro area. Similar to the FEMA Urban Search and Rescue Task Forces located across the United States, MN-TF1 is a State of Minnesota resource designed to assist with emergencies involving natural or manmade disasters that require search and rescue personnel. The task force is made up of firefighters, police officers and paramedics with specialties including heavy rescue, HazMat, medical and structure engineers. Along with members of the Minneapolis Fire Department, the team also has members from the Edina Fire Department, Rochester Fire Department, Dakota County Special Operations Team, and Saint Paul Fire Department

Stations and apparatus 
 this is a complete list of all Minneapolis Fire Department fire station locations and the apparatus assigned to them.

Notable Incidents

Minneapolis Thanksgiving Day Fire

On Thanksgiving night November 25, 1982, fire destroyed an entire block of Downtown Minneapolis the 16-story headquarters of Northwestern National Bank (now Wells Fargo) and the vacant, partially demolished location formerly occupied by Donaldson's department store, which had recently moved across the street to the new City Center mall. While no deaths were reported, 10 Minneapolis Firefighters were taken to the hospital with injuries suffered as a result of this fire. This was the second largest property fire in the US in 1982 and one of the largest in Minneapolis history, with 85% of the entire department (on and off duty) responding to the fire. The cause of the fire was suspected to be two juveniles playing with an acetylene torch in the vacant department store which set fire to a debris pile (charges were later dropped). The fire spread to the neighboring Norwest Bank building, which quickly spread throughout the building due to several factors including a central open atrium that allowed the fire to easily reach the upper floors and lack of fire suppression (aka sprinklers) and lack of fire containment. This fire led to significant widespread changes to building fire code.

I-35 West Mississippi River Bridge Collapse

In 2007 the Minneapolis Fire Department responded to the I-35W Mississippi River bridge collapse after the central span of the bridge suddenly gave way, followed by the adjoining spans. Northern sections of the bridge fell into a rail yard, landing on three unoccupied and stationary freight cars.

American Opioid Crisis
In 2016, the department equipped its 19 fire companies with Narcan (Nalaxone) nasal spray to counteract the effects of opioid/heroin drug overdoses. Through 2019, first responders had revived 920 individuals experiencing a probable opiate overdose, all carefully logged and documented in logs written by the members of the department. The numbers in adjacent St. Paul are high as well; since 2015 that city’s paramedics have administered 2,800 Narcan doses. Both cities’ police departments also carry the nasal spray.

George Floyd protests 

The Minneapolis Fire Department responded to several fires during the period of widespread civil unrest that followed the May 25, 2020, murder of George Floyd. Across the metropolitan region, the FBI and ATF investigated 164 structure fires from arson that occurred May 27–30, 2020, during the George Floyd protests in Minneapolis–Saint Paul. Some fires spread to adjacent structures or damaged multi-use buildings. Most of properties affected by arson were commercial businesses. Arson fires also damaged a variety of buildings containing schools, non-profit organizations, government services, and private residences.

See also 
 John Cheatham (firefighter)

References

External links

 minneapolismn.gov/fire/
 Extra Alarm Assoc. of the Twin Cities

Fire departments in Minnesota
Fire